Jersey Girl may refer to:

Jersey Girls, or "Jersey Widows", the media name for four American women who lost their husbands in the September 11, 2001 terrorist attacks
Jersey Girl (1992 film), an American romantic comedy starring Dylan McDermott and Jami Gertz
Jersey Girl (2004 film), an American romantic comedy starring Ben Affleck and Liv Tyler
"Jersey Girl" (song), a song composed and originally sung by American singer-songwriter Tom Waits

See also
Jersey Boy
Jersey Boys (disambiguation)